Maria Gomori (May 25, 1920 – December 10, 2021) was a Hungarian-born Canadian pioneer in the field of systems family therapy. She contributed to the fields of psychiatric and social work training, and designed numerous training programs. She was a proponent of the Satir Method for Family Therapy. In 2004, she was named "Woman of Distinction" for the field of Health and Wellness by the City of Winnipeg. In the same year Winnipeg's Saint Boniface Hospital Research Centre established a lectureship in her name to honour her long and varied contributions to the health system and the people who use it.

Life and career
She earned a B.A. at the Sorbonne, an Economics degree in her native Budapest, an M.S.W. at the University of Manitoba, Dip.C. from the Haven Institute and Ph.D. from the Open International University. Gomori developed the family therapy training program for the residents in psychiatry at St. Boniface Hospital in Winnipeg, MB, and was the Coordinator and Director of the Social Work Department at this hospital for 14 years. In her retirement, she continued to lecture and offer seminars and workshops around the world, teaching annually in China and Taiwan and North America, even at the age of 88. She collaborated with Bennet Wong and Jock McKeen for over thirty years, and was an Emeritus Faculty of the Haven Institute.

After enduring the Nazi incursion in her native Budapest in the 1940s, she completed her education and rose quickly in the Hungarian Government's department of Economics. She fled Hungary with her husband and young son in 1956 in the midst of the Hungarian Revolution without money or possessions. They moved to Winnipeg, Manitoba, Canada, where she studied social work. Her life focus was on freedom.  She received numerous honours and citations.

Gomori was a family therapist in private practice, and an Associate Professor in the Department of Psychiatry at the University of Manitoba's Faculty of Medicine. Gomori was also a Clinical Member and Approved Supervisor with AAMFT, the American Association of Marriage and Family Therapy. She worked intensively with Virginia Satir for over 20 years and was a faculty member and advanced trainer in Satir's Avanta International Training Organization from 1981. Gomori was also a certified practitioner and Master Programmer in Neuro-linguistic programming.

She died in Winnipeg on December 10, 2021, at the age of 101.

Contributions
Gomori established an international reputation as a workshop leader, teaching, demonstrating and applying her interpretation of the Satir model. She conducted workshops throughout Canada, the United States, Europe, South America, Thailand, Hong Kong, Taiwan, China and Australia. She co-authored with Virginia Satir et al. The Satir Approach to Communication and The Satir Model: Family Therapy and Beyond; the latter book was chosen by the AAMFT Foundation for the 1994 Satir Education and Research Prize. Gomori worked tirelessly in her international lectures and seminars, and was instrumental in establishing Satir Institutes in Winnipeg, Hong Kong, Taiwan, and Australia. She integrated Virginia Satir's approach with her learnings from other teachers combined with her own experiences.

Publications
 Gomori, Maria and Adaskin, Eleanor. "Desperately Seeking French Fries: A Case Example of Satir's Family Sculpting", Issaquah, WA: Anchor Point, March 1993, pp. 11–16.
 Gomori, Maria, Baldwin, M., Gerber, J. and Schwab, J. (1990). The Satir Approach to Communication, Palo Alto, CA: Science and Behavior Books.  ISBN
 Satir, Virginia; Banmen, John; Gerber, Jane; & Gomori, Maria. (1991). The Satir Model, Palo Alto, CA: Science and Behavior Books.  
 Gomori, Maria. "Integrating Satir and PD Concepts", Gabriola Island, BC: Shen, Issue #22, Fall 1998.
 Gomori, Maria and Adaskin, Eleanor. (2000). "Finding Freedom, a chapter in Virginia Satir: Her Life and Circle of Influence, Palo Alto, CA: Science and Behavior Books.  
 Gomori, Maria. (2001). Meeting the Self: A Family Reconstruction (5 Videos), Taipei, Taiwan: Shiuh Li Liuh Foundation.
 Gomori, Maria. (2002). Passion For Freedom, Palo Alto, CA: Science and Behavior Books.  
 Gomori, Maria. (2004). Passion For Freedom (Chinese Translation), Taipei, Taiwan: Living Psychology Publishers. 
 Gomori, Maria, with Adaskin, E. (2008). Personal Alchemy: The Art of Satir Family Reconstruction, Hong Kong: Satir Center for Human Development.

Notes

References
 .
 .
 .
 .
 .
 .
 .
 .
 .
 .

External links
 Maria Gomori's Obituary and website
 The Haven Institute
 The Haven Foundation
 Maria Gomori: "Integrating Satir and PD Concepts"
 Maria Gomori's Faculty Listing at Haven Institute
 Edward Marshall: "Lessons in Courage from Maria Gomori"
 Satir Professional Development Institute of Manitoba
 Taiwan Satir Center

1920 births
2021 deaths
Canadian centenarians
Canadian health and wellness writers
Family therapists
Human Potential Movement
Hungarian centenarians
Hungarian emigrants to Canada
Women centenarians
Writers from Budapest